The Spoornet Class 39-000 of 2006 is a South African diesel-electric locomotive from the Spoornet era.

In 2005, Transwerk commenced a project of rebuilding one hundred existing locomotives to new Class 39-000 Electro-Motive Diesel type GT26CU-3 locomotives for Spoornet. Only five were eventually rebuilt and placed in service between April 2006 and 2009.

Manufacturer
In 2005, a project commenced to rebuild one hundred Class 39-000 Electro-Motive Diesel (EMD) type GT26CU-3 diesel-electric locomotives for Spoornet from Classes 34-600 and 34-800 type GT26MC and Class 37-000 type GT26M2C locomotives. The original locomotives had all originally been designed by General Motors Electro-Motive Division (GM-EMD) and had been built by General Motors South Africa (GMSA) in Port Elizabeth between 1974 and 1981. Suitable frames from wrecked locomotives were to be used.

Rebuilding

Number 39-251
Two companies were invited to produce prototypes for the project. One was Electro-Motive Sibanye, a joint venture between the recently established Electro-Motive Diesel (EMD) and Sibanye Trade and Services, a South African Black Economic Empowerment (BEE) company which dealt in locomotives and spare parts. The Sibanye venture produced only one locomotive, which was rebuilt from Class  no.  in 2008 and numbered . The locomotive was tested, but rejected by Transnet, reportedly due to poor quality. Furthermore, when serious tender irregularities came to light, the locomotive rebuilding deal between Transnet and Sibanye was cancelled.

Even though it was painted in the red Transnet Freight Rail livery, no.  never worked for Transnet.

The locomotive did have the distinctive cab roof profile of other locomotives in the EMD family, unlike the completely different rounded cab roof profile of its successful competitor. When the Electro-Motive Sibanye joint venture was dissolved, the locomotive remained in the possession of Sibanye Trade and Services and was renumbered .

Numbers 39-001 to 39-005
The other company was Transwerk, later Transnet Rail Engineering (TRE) and then Transnet Engineering, who produced five locomotives at its Bloemfontein shops between 2005 and 2008, rebuilt from three wrecked Class  and two Class  locomotives.

It was intended to produce one hundred Class  locomotives, but in spite of the technical success of the TRE part of the project rebuilding was halted after completing five locomotives, allegedly due to higher than anticipated cost. Instead of rebuilding one hundred old locomotives, it was decided to rather continue the program by building fifty new  locomotives from imported and locally produced components. This was to take place at the Koedoespoort shops of TRE.

Features
The original Class identity of each Class  locomotive can be visually determined by the difference between their left side sills. The three ex Class  locomotives have thicker fishbelly-shaped left sills, compared to the thinner straight left sills of the two ex Class  locomotives.

Improvements over the pre-rebuilt locomotives which were realised in the Class  include microprocessor control, 26% more maximum continuous tractive effort and 15% more tractive horse-power, and a Knorr-Bremse electronic brake rack (EBR) to replace the old pneumatic braking controls.

Works numbers
The original Classes 34-600, 34-800 and 37-000 numbers and works numbers of the Class 39-000 locomotives are listed in the table.

Service
The five Class  locomotives were initially placed in service on the Pretoria-Komatipoort section of the line to Maputo in Mozambique to work in conjunction with Class  locomotives on the heavy grades of the Belfast-Steelpoort section in Mpumalanga. By 2013, once the Class  locomotive fleet had also entered service, they were redeployed to the Thabazimbi iron ore line and shedded at Pyramid South.

Illustration
The main picture shows no.  at Pyramid South, north of Pretoria, as delivered in Transnet Freight Rail livery. Of the five Class  locomotives, only no.  was delivered in Spoornet's blue livery with outline numbers.

References

Cape gauge railway locomotives
Co+Co locomotives
Diesel-electric locomotives of South Africa
Electro-Motive Diesel locomotives
GMSA locomotives
Transnet Rail Engineering locomotives
Railway locomotives introduced in 2006